İvrindi is a town and district of Balıkesir Province in the Marmara region of Turkey. The population is 6368 (as of 2010). The mayor is Recai Baytar (AKP).

References

Populated places in Balıkesir Province
Districts of Balıkesir Province